Hymenia is a genus of moths of the family Crambidae.

Species
Hymenia lophoceralis (Hampson, 1912)
Hymenia nigerrimalis (Hampson, 1900)
Hymenia perspectalis (Hübner, 1796)

References

Spilomelinae
Crambidae genera
Taxa named by Jacob Hübner